Newport State Park is a  Wisconsin state park at the tip of Door Peninsula near Europe Lake.  Protecting  of shoreline on Lake Michigan, Newport is Wisconsin's only wilderness-designated state park. The park is open year-round and can be accessed via WIS 42.

History 
In 1946, the State Planning Board and the Wisconsin Conservation Department recommended the area as a place to develop a park. In 1958 the National Park Service and the Wisconsin Conservation Department also recommended the area. On September 24, 1964, the park was established as Europe Bay State Park. In August 1970, the name was changed to Newport State Park to reflect a park expansion. In 1970 the day use area and entrance road were constructed.  Campsites were completed in the summer of 1973. On April 25, 1978 a tract of land between Europe Lake and Europe Bay was added to the park.

In 2017, the International Dark-Sky Association named Newport a Dark Sky Park.

Air pollution monitor

The only public air pollution monitor in the county is located in Newport State Park. Most air pollution reaching the station comes from outside the county. This map shows how air travels to the monitoring station. Because the station is near the shore, only the red lines (which show the lower air currents) meaningfully depict the path of ozone to the monitor. As shown on the map, these lower air currents carry polluted air from major urban areas. Farther inland, however, the air from higher up mixes more, so all color lines are significant when tracing the path of air pollution further inland, and these higher air currents (shown in green and blue) blow in from cleaner, mostly rural areas.

Climate

The climate of Newport is humid, microthermal with cool summers and with an even monthly precipitation distribution. The climate of the park is modified considerably by its close proximity to Lake Michigan and Green Bay. This is reflected in the fewer number of days with extremely high or low temperatures than are common for that latitude. Spring and early summer are retarded by the surrounding cool water; summers are mild and pleasant. Relatively warm lake water delays the first freeze in fall, and the winters are cold. The lake influence is also seen in higher average cloudiness and lower percentage of sunshine than is found at stations located further away from the lake.

From data compiled in 1974, prevailing winds are from the northwest through the southwest, with the exception of early spring when northeast winds dominate. April and November are the windiest months with averages of 12 miles per hour. Speeds in excess of 60 miles per hour can be expected to occur in seven of ten years. The highest speeds are usually from the west or southwest.

As of figures available in 1974, the percentage of possible sunshine has averaged about 40 percent for November and December and 60 percent or more from May through September. The remaining months average between 50 and 60 percent. The yearly average temperature at Sturgeon Bay is 43.8 °F. The average daily maximum for the month of January is 26.7 °F with the average daily minimum for January at 10.4 °F. The average daily maximum for July is 80.1 °F with an average daily minimum of 57.4 °F.

Gallery

Plants

Aerial views

References

External links

Newport Wilderness Society (Friends Group of Newport State Park)
Interactive Map of Air Quality, Northeast Wisconsin, Environmental Protection Agency (Has real-time ozone readings from the monitor at Newport State Park.)
Newport State Park website
Park map (pdf, Wisconsin DNR, archived June 24, 2021)
Winter Use Map (pdf, Wisconsin DNR, archived June 24, 2021)
Hunting and Trapping Map (pdf, Wisconsin DNR, archived June 24, 2021)
Park map (pdf, huntfishcampwisconsin.com)
Interactive trail map (Trail Genius)

Protected areas of Door County, Wisconsin
State parks of Wisconsin
Protected areas established in 1964
1964 establishments in Wisconsin
International Dark Sky Reserves